"Perverso" (also released under the title "Xverso") is a song written by Italian pop singer Tiziano Ferro. It was released as the first single from his second album 111 (2003) and achieved huge success in Italy and Switzerland.

Chart performance
In Italy, "Perverso" debuted at number five on the Italian Singles Chart on October 9, 2003.  The following week, the single fell to number 8, and fell to number 9 in its third week. However, the song rose to number 8 in its fourth week, and again to number 6 in its fifth. The song stayed twelve weeks on the charts and five of those weeks within the top 10. "Perverso" became Ferro's first and only single from the 111 era to officially chart in Italy.

The song debuted at number 17 on the Swiss Singles Chart and stayed within the chart for eleven weeks.

"Perverso" also charted in Germany at number 48 and Belgium at number 39.

Track listing

Digital download
 "Perverso" – 3:41

Italian CD Single
 "Perverso" — 3:41
 "Un Pour Toi Un Pour Moi" — 3:41

German CD Single
 "Perverso" — 3:41
 "Perverso" (Spanish Version) — 3:41
 "Un Pour Toi Un Pour Moi" — 3:41

Charts

Release history

References

2003 singles
Italian-language songs
Tiziano Ferro songs
Songs written by Tiziano Ferro